Clepsis humana is a species of moth of the family Tortricidae. It is found in Sikkim, India and in Nepal.

References

Moths described in 1912
Clepsis